Edgar George David  was a college football player.

Oglethorpe
David was a prominent baseball, basketball and football player for the Oglethorpe Stormy Petrels of Oglethorpe University. He was captain of the football team in 1922, a year in which he was selected All-Southern. He was inducted into the Oglethorpe Athletic Hall of Fame. The Yamacraw, the school's yearbook, remarked his coach said "that no finer leader ever graced a southern gridiron than Ed David."

References

American football ends
All-Southern college football players
Oglethorpe Stormy Petrels football players
Oglethorpe Stormy Petrels baseball players